Asthena albosignata is a moth in the family Geometridae first described by Frederic Moore in 1888. It is found in India, Bhutan, China and Kashmir.

References

Moths described in 1888
Asthena
Moths of Asia